The 1939 Georgia Tech Yellow Jackets football team represented the Georgia Institute of Technology during the 1939 college football season. The Yellow Jackets were led by 20th-year head coach William Alexander and played their home games at Grant Field in Atlanta, Georgia.

Georgia Tech finished undefeated in Southeastern Conference play, claiming a share of the conference title with Tennessee and Tulane. They suffered two close non-conference losses: the first, a season-opening road trip loss to Notre Dame; and the second, a one-point loss to Duke at home, in which Georgia Tech missed the would-be tying point-after attempt in the second quarter and missed the winning field goal in the final minute of the game. The Yellow Jackets finished ranked in the final AP Poll for the first time, and were invited to their second ever bowl game, the 1940 Orange Bowl, where they defeated Missouri.

Schedule

References

Georgia Tech
Georgia Tech Yellow Jackets football seasons
Southeastern Conference football champion seasons
Orange Bowl champion seasons
Georgia Tech Yellow Jackets football